Hopea megacarpa is a tree in the family Dipterocarpaceae, native to Borneo. The specific epithet megacarpa means "big fruit".

Description
The bark is smooth.

Distribution and habitat
Hopea megacarpa is endemic to Borneo. Its habitat is mixed dipterocarp forests.

Conservation
Hopea megacarpa has been assessed as endangered on the IUCN Red List. It is threatened by logging activities. In Kalimantan, the species occurs in protected areas.

References

megacarpa
Endemic flora of Borneo
Plants described in 1967
Taxonomy articles created by Polbot